George A. Ayres (born 1899, date of death unknown) was an English footballer who played in The Football League for Charlton Athletic, Sheffield Wednesday and Blackpool. He was born  in Sutton, London, England.

References

English footballers
Blackpool F.C. players
Charlton Athletic F.C. players
Sheffield Wednesday F.C. players
English Football League players
1899 births
Footballers from Sutton, London
Association football forwards
Year of death missing